Strickland House may refer to:

in Australia
Strickland House, Vaucluse

in the United States (by state then town)
Strickland-Herold House, Miccosukee, Florida, listed on the National Register of Historic Places (NRHP) 
Strickland House (La Grange, Georgia), NRHP-listed in Troup County
Collins-Odom-Strickland House, Macon, Georgia, NRHP-listed in Bibb County
Hood-Strickland House Smithfield, North Carolina, NRHP-listed in Johnston County
Strickland-Roberts Homestead, Kimberton, Pennsylvania, listed on the NRHP in northern Chester County]]
William Strickland Row, Philadelphia, Pennsylvania, listed on the NRHP in Center City
Strickland-Sawyer House, Waxahachie, Texas, listed on the National Register of Historic Places in Ellis County